Black August is an annual commemoration and prison-based holiday to remember Black freedom fights and political prisoners and to highlight Black resistance against racial oppression. It takes place during the entire calendar month of August.

Black August was initiated by the Black Guerilla Family in San Quentin State Prison in 1979 when a group of incarcerated people came together to commemorate the deaths of brothers Jonathan P. Jackson (d. August 7, 1970) and George Jackson (d. August 21, 1971) at San Quentin State Prison.

Impact in culture and the arts 
Black August as a cultural movement has had a significant impact in the arts. The 2008 film Black August (film) focuses on the experiences of prison activist George Jackson. A book named Black August: 1619  – 2019 by Gloria Verdieu released in 2019. The Black Collective launched the Black August Mixtape in 2019. In visual art, the virtual exhibition "Black August" opened at the Crenshaw Dairy Mart in 2020.

References 

African-American events
August observances
Commemorative months
1979 introductions
Observances in the United States
 African-American socialism
Black Power